Stevie Mallan may refer to:

Stevie Mallan (footballer, born 1967), Scottish striker
Stevie Mallan (footballer, born 1996), Scottish midfielder